The Inscrutable Americans is a 1991 novel by Anurag Mathur. Tri-Color Communications adapted the book into a film in 2001.

Plot
Gopal Kumar, the son of a hair oil tycoon in Madhya Pradesh, arrives in America to study chemical engineering in a university in Eversville. As he reaches New York, he received by Sunil and Sushant and his comic discovery of America starts. He stays with them for one night and takes a flight to Eversville, the next day. During his journey to the airport, he discovers a part of New York from where his bewilderment starts right from the American girls, new gadgets, the naked billboards, vegetarian cats and continues with telephone and multi channeled color TV. He meets Randy, who welcomes him at the airport and tries to introduce him to the American society and culture. In all the letters to his brother he complains about the language and his inability to understand it, which results in embarrassing situations. As we move into the rising action, we see Gopal’s priorities and thought process changes as he is exposed to American way of life as earlier, he said “I am only going to classes, library and home” but goes with Randy to see a real bar. He gets absorbed in American way of life as he even asks for cigarette to impress the lady at bar. He meets Anand (the only other Indian on campus) and dislikes him as he portrays America in a superior class and thinks “India has a lot of growing up to do and America will show the way”. He even comes across his internal conflict of whether to continue his study after the incident that takes place outside the bar. Eventually, he takes decision to continue his study and even goes with Randy to Springfield (Randy’s hometown). He begins to learn the joy of analysis and finds that American students are unable to utilize the opportunities provided by their institutions at higher level. One day, while returning from library he meets Sue and gets touched by the emotions shown by Sue towards him. But, his heart breaks when he finds another man with Sue and spends the next few hours drinking and vomiting. One day while coming out of library he meets Tom (head waiter) and gets to know about his poverty, but he is exposed to the actual reality of America when he goes with Peacock to the junkyard and the ghost town. He is shaken on seeing the poverty in the richest of all lands and on the notion that white Americans separate black ones from them and do not care of them. This way for the first time he comes across the ugly side of America. His worst part of loneliness comes when Christmas vacation descends upon the campus like a mist of silence. He feels lonely and depressed and starts missing his parents and friends in India and also Randy. He tries to overcome this by spending time in malls where he comes across a leaflet of a massage center. He goes to the center in order to fulfill his fantasy but returns unsuccessfully. Even after vacations he gets chances to see and meet naked
women of America and to fulfill his fantasy, first at girl's dormitory, another at an ice show and at a lake party respectively but fails to score.  Finally, his one year comes to an end and he departs from his campus taking with him memories of his experiences in America. Climax comes when Gopal meets a woman in the
plane. He begins discussing with her, his adventures with women in America, his fears of boring future in India and an unknown wife. He feels absorbed by her
and they start kissing while talking. Finally, his fantasy is fulfilled when 30,000 feet above the ocean, Gopal feels he has truly become a man. This way
the novel ends without any resolution.

References 

1991 novels
Novels set in the United States
Indian novels adapted into films
1991 Indian novels
Indian-American culture